In seven-dimensional geometry, a hexicated 7-orthoplex (also hexicated 7-cube) is a convex uniform 7-polytope, including 6th-order truncations (hexication) from the regular 7-orthoplex.

There are 32 hexications for the 7-orthoplex, including all permutations of truncations, cantellations, runcinations, sterications, and pentellations. 12 are represented here, while 20 are more easily constructed from the 7-cube.

Hexitruncated 7-orthoplex

Alternate names
 Petitruncated heptacross

Images

Hexicantellated 7-orthoplex

Alternate names
 Petirhombated heptacross

Images

Hexicantitruncated 7-orthoplex

Alternate names
 Petigreatorhombated heptacross

Images

Hexiruncitruncated 7-orthoplex

Alternate names
 Petiprismatotruncated heptacross

Images

Hexiruncicantellated 7-orthoplex  

In seven-dimensional geometry, a hexiruncicantellated 7-orthoplex is a uniform 7-polytope.

Alternate names
 Petiprismatorhombated heptacross

Images

Hexisteritruncated 7-orthoplex

Alternate names
 Peticellitruncated heptacross

Images

Hexiruncicantitruncated 7-orthoplex

Alternate names
 Petigreatoprismated heptacross

Images

Hexistericantitruncated 7-orthoplex

Alternate names 
 Peticelligreatorhombated heptacross

Images

Hexisteriruncitruncated 7-orthoplex

Alternate names
 Peticelliprismatotruncated heptacross

Images

Hexipenticantitruncated 7-orthoplex

Alternate names
 Petiterigreatorhombated heptacross

Images

Hexisteriruncicantitruncated 7-orthoplex

Alternate names
 Great petacellated heptacross

Images

Hexipentiruncicantitruncated 7-orthoplex

Alternate names
 Petiterigreatoprismated heptacross

Images

Notes

References 
 H.S.M. Coxeter: 
 H.S.M. Coxeter, Regular Polytopes, 3rd Edition, Dover New York, 1973 
 Kaleidoscopes: Selected Writings of H.S.M. Coxeter, edited by F. Arthur Sherk, Peter McMullen, Anthony C. Thompson, Asia Ivic Weiss, Wiley-Interscience Publication, 1995,  
 (Paper 22) H.S.M. Coxeter, Regular and Semi Regular Polytopes I, [Math. Zeit. 46 (1940) 380-407, MR 2,10]
 (Paper 23) H.S.M. Coxeter, Regular and Semi-Regular Polytopes II, [Math. Zeit. 188 (1985) 559-591]
 (Paper 24) H.S.M. Coxeter, Regular and Semi-Regular Polytopes III, [Math. Zeit. 200 (1988) 3-45]
 Norman Johnson Uniform Polytopes, Manuscript (1991)
 N.W. Johnson: The Theory of Uniform Polytopes and Honeycombs, PhD (1966)

External links 
 Polytopes of Various Dimensions
 Multi-dimensional Glossary

7-polytopes